Hymenophyton is a genus of the order Pallaviciniales (liverworts) containing one to three species. The genus was formerly described as monotypic, as each member possesses a close morphological resemblance, but phytochemical and molecular evidence now supports an infrageneric classification two separate species. The name Hymenophyton leptopodum, regarded as a synonym of Hymenophyton flabellatum, has been resurrected. A population found in Chile is regarded as a separate clade, and the reinstatement of Hymenophyton pedicellatum has been proposed.

References

Pallaviciniales
Liverwort genera